Joshua Ganson (born 19 February 1998) is an English professional rugby league footballer who plays as a  for the Widnes Vikings in the Betfred Championship.

He previously played for the Wigan Warriors in the Super League.

Background
Ganson was born in Billinge Higher End, Wigan, England.

His father, Steve Ganson, is a former Super League referee and current Head of Match Officials at the Rugby Football League.

Career
In 2017, Ganson made his Wigan Super League début against the Castleford Tigers.

References

External links
Wigan Warriors profile
Wigan Warriors U19 profile
SL profile

1998 births
Living people
English rugby league players
London Skolars players
Rugby league hookers
Rugby league players from Wigan
Swinton Lions players
Wigan Warriors players